Boyes Hot Springs (also called Boyes Springs or The Springs)is a census-designated place (CDP) in Sonoma Valley, Sonoma County, California, United States.  The population was 6,656 people at the 2010 census. Resorts in Boyes Hot Springs, El Verano, Fetters Hot Springs, and Agua Caliente were popular health retreats for tourists from San Francisco and points beyond until the middle of the 20th century because of the geothermic hot springs that still well up from deep within the earth.

History
The area was first occupied by Indigenous peoples, who discovered and used the hot springs that the area is named after. Under Mexican rule, in July 1840, Lazaro Piña was deeded 50,000 acres as Rancho Agua Caliente. Sometime in 1849 Thaddeus M. Leavenworth acquired 320 acres of the Rancho in what became present-day Agua Caliente, Fetters Hot Springs, Boyes Hot Springs, and part of Maxwell Farm. In 1889, property was being sold in the area as being near the "celebrated old Indian Medicine Spring." Henry Ernest Boyes discovered hot springs in 1895 in the central part of the area. He and his wife called the area Agua Rica. and started the Boyes Hot Springs Hotel, now the site of the Fairmont Sonoma Mission Inn & Spa. The area became popular with tourists, with over 70,000 visiting each year. A railroad serviced the area during this period.

A wildfire in September 1923 destroyed the settlement.

During the Great Depression, the area's tourism business stopped and the hotel closed. During that period, the Oakland Oaks and San Francisco Seals did their spring training in Boyes Hot Springs. Tourism became the region's main economic focus again later in the 1930s, then during World War II it was taken over by the United States Navy, who sent sailors to the area for recreation. Railroad service stopped in 1942.

Today, the area is primarily residential with a large Latino population. Boyes Hot Springs is part of an area called "The Springs", which also includes Fetters Hot Springs and Agua Caliente.

Geography
Boyes Hot Springs is known for, and named after, the hot springs that run 1,100 feet below the surface. Today, the springs are accessible through the Fairmont Hotel and Spa located in the area. The springs run at 135 degrees.

Infrastructure

Transportation
Sonoma County Transit runs bus services through the Boyes Springs area.

Geography

Climate
This region experiences hot and dry summers, with average summer temps between 85-110 degrees.  According to the Köppen Climate Classification system, Boyes Hot Springs has a warm-summer Mediterranean climate, abbreviated "Csb" on climate maps.

Demographics

2010
The 2010 United States Census reported that Boyes Hot Springs had a population of 6,656. The racial makeup of Boyes Hot Springs was 4,505 (39.1%) White, 48 (0.7%) African American, 91 (1.4%) Native American, 84 (1.3%) Asian, 9 (0.1%) Pacific Islander, 1,674 (25.2%) from other races, and 245 (3.7%) from two or more races. Hispanic or Latino of any race were 6784 persons (67.7%)

The Census reported that 99.9% of the population lived in households and 0.1% lived in non-institutionalized group quarters.

There were 2,322 households, out of which 888 (38.2%) had children under the age of 18 living in them, 1,082 (46.6%) were opposite-sex married couples living together, 267 (11.5%) had a female householder with no husband present, 162 (7.0%) had a male householder with no wife present.  There were 190 (8.2%) unmarried opposite-sex partnerships, and 28 (1.2%) same-sex married couples or partnerships. 598 households (25.8%) were made up of individuals, and 195 (8.4%) had someone living alone who was 65 years of age or older. The average household size was 2.86.  There were 1,511 families (65.1% of all households); the average family size was 3.46.

The population was spread out, with 1,763 people (26.5%) under the age of 18, 654 people (9.8%) aged 18 to 24, 1,957 people (29.4%) aged 25 to 44, 1,664 people (25.0%) aged 45 to 64, and 618 people (9.3%) who were 65 years of age or older.  The median age was 34.0 years. For every 100 females, there were 103.3 males.  For every 100 females age 18 and over, there were 104.0 males.

The homeowner vacancy rate was 1.6%; the rental vacancy rate was 3.6%. 46.6% of the population lived in owner-occupied housing units and 53.3% lived in rental housing units.

2000
As of the census of 2000, there were 6,665 people, 2,256 households, and 1,495 families residing in the CDP. The racial makeup of the CDP was 74.99% White, 0.42% African American, 0.72% Native American, 0.92% Asian, 0.09% Pacific Islander, 18.24% from other races, and 4.62% from two or more races. Hispanic or Latino of any race were 41.67% of the population.

There were 2,256 households, out of which 37.7% had children under the age of 18 living with them, 49.5% were married couples living together, 11.0% had a female householder with no husband present, and 33.7% were non-families. 25.0% of all households were made up of individuals, and 6.4% had someone living alone who was 65 years of age or older.  The average household size was 2.95 and the average family size was 3.53.

In the CDP, the population was spread out, with 28.5% under the age of 18, 10.7% from 18 to 24, 32.8% from 25 to 44, 20.2% from 45 to 64, and 7.8% who were 65 years of age or older.  The median age was 32 years. For every 100 females, there were 104.4 males.  For every 100 females age 18 and over, there were 105.7 males.

The median income for a household in the CDP was $50,668, and the median income for a family was $54,469. Males had a median income of $35,085 versus $28,951 for females. The per capita income for the CDP was $20,115.  About 8.6% of families and 12.0% of the population were below the poverty line, including 16.0% of those under age 18 and 9.9% of those age 65 or over.

Economy

Historically, tourism has been a major economic factor for the area, focusing around the attraction of the naturally occurring hot springs. The springs were not only used for bathing, but, also for bottling. Electricity ran bottling plants, which bottled carbonated and still water for consumption.

Tourism and food
Boyes Hot Springs is the site of the third Fairmont Hotel and Resorts property in Northern California, the Fairmont Sonoma Mission Inn & Spa. The high end hotel is located on a historic hotel site that served as a popular getaway for tourists in the 1920s who used the hot springs located in the area. The spa on-site uses the hot springs that the area is named after. The restaurant El Molino Central serves Mexican street food and is known for its house made tortillas. The Italian restaurant Mary's Pizza Shack opened its first restaurant in Boyes Hot Springs. Boyes Hot Springs is also known for having one of the first Michelin Guide star rated restaurants in the area, Santé, which is located in the Fairmont.

Government

Notable residents

Shotsie Gorman, tattoo artist, painter, sculptor and poet

References

External links

Census-designated places in Sonoma County, California
Hot springs of California
Sonoma Valley
Bodies of water of Sonoma County, California
Census-designated places in California
Tourist attractions in Sonoma County, California